Greenbush Township is located in Warren County, Illinois. As of the 2010 census, its population was 533 and it contained 286 housing units.

Geography

Demographics

References

External links
City-data.com
Illinois State Archives

Townships in Warren County, Illinois
Galesburg, Illinois micropolitan area
Townships in Illinois